Famous people, past and present, with Parkinson's disease include:

Living

Alan Alda (born 1936), American actor.
Steve Alten (born 1959), American author.
Alex Band (born 1981), American singer (The Calling).
Andy Barrie (born 1945), Canadian radio personality.
Cait Brennan (born 1969), American musician and screenwriter.
Roberto Carcelen (born 1970), Peruvian-American cross-country skier.
Rory Cellan-Jones (born 1958), British journalist.
Alf Clausen (born 1941), American film and television composer.
Billy Connolly (born 1942), Scottish comedian and actor.
Neil Diamond (born 1941), American singer.
Lesley Elliott, New Zealand campaigner.
Michael J. Fox (born 1961), Canadian-American actor.
Gerald Ganglbauer (born 1958), Austrian publisher. 
Kirk Gibson (born 1957), American baseball player and manager.
Brian Grant (born 1972), American basketball player.
Gunther von Hagens (born 1945), German anatomist.
Fergus Henderson (born 1963), English chef.
Jesse Jackson (born 1941), American civil rights activist.
Martha Johnson (born 1950), Canadian singer (Martha and the Muffins).
Richie Kavanagh (born 1949), Irish singer.
Billy Kennedy (born 1964), American basketball coach.
Jansher Khan (born 1969), Pakistani squash player.
Michael Kinsley (born 1951), American journalist and commentator.
Steve Kragthorpe (born 1965), American football coach.
Gerald M. Levin (born 1939), American businessman. 
Steve Ludzik (born 1961), Canadian ice hockey player and coach.
Dean Malenko (born 1960), American professional wrestler.
Mark Mardell (born 1957), British broadcaster.
Paul Mayhew-Archer (born 1953), British radio and television comedy producer and writer.
Steve McCoy, American radio host.
Antanas Mockus (born 1952), Colombian politician.
Ozzy Osbourne (born 1948), English singer (Black Sabbath).
Jeremy Paxman (born 1950), British broadcaster.
Valerie Perrine (born 1943), American actress and model.
Brent Peterson (born 1958), Canadian ice hockey player and coach.
Davis Phinney (born 1959), American cyclist.
Bill Rasmussen (born 1932), American sports director.
Ed Rendell (born 1944), American politician.
Mark Richt (born 1960), American college football coach.
Freddie Roach (born 1960), American boxer.
Linda Ronstadt (born 1946), American singer.
Guy Scott (born 1944), Zambian politician, acting President of Zambia.
José E. Serrano (born 1943), American politician.
Rick Shapiro (born 1959), American comedian and actor.
Paul Sinha (born 1970), British comedian.
Glenn Tipton (born 1947), English guitarist (Judas Priest).
Lars von Trier (born 1956), Danish film director and screenwriter.
John Walker (born 1952), New Zealand runner.

Deceased

Purushottam Laxman Deshpande (1919–2000; aged 80), Better known by his initials "Pu. La.", a Marathi writer and humourist.
Tenshō-in (1836–1883; aged 47), Japanese noblewoman. 
Muhammad Ali (1942–2016; aged 74), originally was diagnosed with Parkinson's syndrome, later refined to Parkinson's disease: American professional boxer.
Brock Adams (1927–2004; aged 77), American politician.
Jack Anderson (1922–2005; aged 83), American newspaper columnist.
Al Arbour (1932–2015; aged 82), Former National Hockey League player and coach. Member of Hockey Hall of Fame.
Jim Backus (1913–1989; aged 76), American actor.
Roger Bannister (1929–2018; aged 88), English neurologist and the first person to run a sub four-minute mile.
José Bernal (1925–2010; aged 85), Cuban-American artist.
Sir John Betjeman (1906–1984; aged 77), CBE, British Poet Laureate.
Dr. Boyi Bhimanna (1911–2005; aged 94), Telugu poet.
Bhumibol Adulyadej (Rama IX) (1927–2016; aged 88), former King of Thailand (1946–2016).
Whit Bissell (1909–1996; aged 86), American actor.
Margaret Bourke-White (1904–1971; aged 67), American photographer.
Jack Buck (1924–2002; aged 77), American sportscaster.
George H. W. Bush (1924–2018; aged 94), 41st President of the United States. 
Lou Butera (1937–2015; aged 78) American professional pool player.
Roger Caron (1938–2012; aged 73), Canadian bank robber.
Owen Chamberlain (1920–2006; aged 85), American physicist.
Barney Childs (1909–2000; aged 73), American composer and teacher
Prince Claus of the Netherlands (1926–2002; aged 76), Prince Consort to Queen Beatrix of the Netherlands.
Joe Cook (1890–1959; aged 69), American actor.
Jeff Cook (1949–2022; aged 73), American guitarist (Alabama).
George Coulouris (1903–1989; aged 85), English actor.
André Courrèges (1923–2016; aged 92), French fashion designer.
Salvador Dalí (1904–1989; aged 84), Spanish artist.
Harry Dalton (1928–2005; aged 77), American baseball executive.
Joyce Davidson (1931–2020; aged 89), Canadian-American television personality and producer.
Robert Downey Sr. (1936–2021; aged 85), American filmmaker and actor.
Deng Xiaoping (1904–1997; aged 92), Chinese politician.
James Doohan (1920–2005; aged 85), Canadian actor.
Basil D'Oliveira (1931–2011; aged 80), South African-born English cricketer.
Lane Evans (1951–2014; aged 63), American politician and Member of the US House of Representatives (D - IL).
William Everson (1912–1994; aged 81), American poet.
Francisco Franco (1892–1975; aged 82), Spanish dictator.
Booth Gardner (1936–2013; aged 76), American politician and Washington state governor.
Michael Gerson (1964–2022; aged 58), American journalist and speechwriter.
Carlos Gomes (1932–2005; aged 73), Portuguese footballer.
Billy Graham (1918–2018; aged 99), American evangelist.
Walter Gretzky (1938–2021; aged 82), Canadian philanthropist, author and father of Wayne Gretzky.
Lizzie Grey (1958–2019; aged 60), American lead vocalist, guitarist, songwriter, originally of rock group London, later with Spiders & Snakes.
Grace Griffith (1956–2021; aged 64), folk and Celtic singer.
Andrew Grove (1938–2016; aged 79), former CEO of Intel Corporation.
Lou Groza (1924–2000; aged 76), American football placekicker/offensive tackle.
Shay Healy (1943–2021; aged 78), Irish songwriter and broadcaster.
Nathan Heard (1937–2004; aged 66), American novelist.
George Roy Hill (1921–2002; aged 81), American Oscar-winning film director.
Chester Himes (1909–1984; aged 75), African-American writer.
Bob Hoskins (1942–2014; aged 71), English actor.
Masud Husain Khan (1919–2010; aged 91), Indian linguist and father of Urdu-Linguistics.
Josefa Iloilo (1920–2011; aged 90), President of Fiji (2000–2009).
Johnny Isakson (1944–2021; aged 76), United States Senator from Georgia.
Sir Alec Issigonis (1906–1988; aged 81), British-Greek car designer.
Mary Jackson (1910–2005; aged 95), American actress.
David Jacobs (1936–2013; aged 87), British radio and television presenter.
Dave Jennings (1952–2013; aged 61), American football player.
Ba Jin (1904–2005; aged 100), Chinese writer.
Pope John Paul II (1920–2005; aged 84), Polish cleric, Pope of Roman Catholic Church.
Dean Jones (1931–2015; aged 84), American actor.
Paulo José (1937–2021; aged 84), Brazilian television and film actor, director and narrator.
Erland Josephson (1923–2012; aged 88), Swedish actor and author.
Pauline Kael (1919–2001; aged 82), American film critic.
Casey Kasem (1932–2014; aged 82), American former radio disc jockey and voice actor. 
Frank Kelly (1938–2016; aged 77), Irish actor, singer and writer.
Ray Kennedy (1951–2021; aged 70), ex-Arsenal F.C., Liverpool F.C., Swansea City and Member of England National Football team.
Deborah Kerr (1921–2007; aged 86), British actress.
Guy Kibbee (1882–1956; aged 74), American stage and film actor.
George Kirby (1923–1995; aged 72) American comedian, singer and actor.
Wilbur Kloefkorn (1923–2018; aged 94), American WWII Army Veteran, Farmer 
Jimmy Knepper (1927–2003; aged 75), American jazz trombonist.
Ted Kroll (1919–2002; aged 82), American professional golfer.
 James Levine (1943–2021; aged 77), American former conductor of the Metropolitan Opera.
John Lindsay (1921–2000; aged 79), Mayor of New York City (1966–1973).
Walter Lord (1917–2002; aged 84), American author.
Mao Zedong (1893–1976; aged 82), Chinese statesman and revolutionary.
Margo MacDonald (1943–2014; aged 70), Member of the Scottish Parliament.
Luis Marden (1913–2003; aged 90), Italian-American photographer.
Carlo Maria Martini (1927–2012; aged 85), Cardinal Archbishop Emeritus of Milan, theologian and biblical exegete.
Ferdy Mayne (1916–1998; aged 81), German actor.
William Masters (1915–2001; aged 85), American gynaecologist and sex researcher.
Eugene McCarthy (1916–2005; aged 89), American politician.
Joseph M. McDade (1931–2017; aged 85), American politician and former Congressman from NE Pennsylvania.
Ralph McQuarrie (1929–2012; aged 82), American artist.
Tony Mendez (1940–2019; aged 78), American CIA Officer portrayed in Argo.
Zell Miller (1932–2018; aged 86), American former governor of the state of Georgia.
Alois Mock (1934–2017; aged 82), Austrian politician.
Leo Monahan (1926–2013; aged 86), American sports journalist.
Kenneth More (1914–1982; aged 67), English actor.
Knowlton Nash (1927–2014; aged 86), Canadian television journalist and author.
Giulio Natta (1903–1979; aged 76), Italian chemist.
Dame Anna Neagle (1904–1986; aged 81), English actress.
Norman Panama (1914–2003; aged 88), American writer, producer and director.
Joe Pasternak (1901–1991; aged 89), American film director.
Mervyn Peake (1911–1968; aged 57), English author and illustrator.
George Perles (1934–2020; aged 85), American football player, defensive coordinator for the Pittsburgh Steelers, head football coach at Michigan State University.
Ray Perrault (1926–2008; aged 82), Canadian politician who served as Senator from British Columbia.
Enoch Powell (1912–1998; aged 85), British politician.
Larry Powers (1939–2015; aged 76), American bodybuilder.
Vincent Price (1911–1993; aged 82), American actor, also had lung cancer.
Hans Ras (1926–2003; aged 77), Dutch linguist and academic.
Sir Michael Redgrave (1908–1985; aged 77), English actor.
John Rosenbaum (1934–2003; aged 69), American artist.
M. Scott Peck (1936–2005; aged 69), American psychiatrist and best-selling author.
Janet Reno (1938–2016; aged 78), Attorney General of the United States (1993–2001).
Matt Robinson (1937–2002; aged 65), American actor.
Masa Saito (1942–2018; aged 76), Japanese professional wrestler.
Leonid Shamkovich (1923–2005; aged 81), USSR Chess Grandmaster.
Walter Sisulu (1912–2003; aged 90), South African freedom fighter.
Sir Osbert Sitwell (1892–1969; aged 76), English writer.
A. J. P. Taylor (1906–1990; aged 84), British historian and writer.
Jerry Sloan (1942–2020; aged 78), American professional basketball player and former Member of NBA.
Jean-Louis Tauran (1943–2018; aged 75), Cardinal-Priest of Sant'Apollinare alle Terme Neroniane-Alessandrine, president of the Pontifical Council for Interreligious Dialogue in the Roman Curia.
Terry-Thomas (1911–1990; aged 78), English actor.
Meldrim Thomson Jr. (1912–2001; aged 89), Republican Governor of New Hampshire.
Richard Thompson (1957–2016; aged 58), American illustrator and Reuben-award-winning cartoonist.
Jeremy Thorpe (1930–2014; aged 85), British politician and leader of the Liberal Party (1967–1976).
Pat Torpey (1953–2018; aged 64), American drummer for the band Mr. Big.
Pierre Trudeau (1919–2000; aged 80), 15th Prime Minister of Canada.
Mo Udall (1922–1998; aged 76), Member of the US House of Representatives.
Tim Wall (1904–1981; aged 76), Australian cricketer.
George Wallace (1919–1998; aged 79), American politician and former governor of Alabama.
Maurice White (1941–2016; aged 74), American singer, musician, founder of R&B band Earth, Wind & Fire.
Albert Whitlock (1915–1999; aged 84), British motion picture matte artist.
Edward Winter (1937–2001; aged 63), American actor.
Harvey D. Williams (1930–2020; aged 90), African-American U.S. Army major general and activist, Deputy Inspector General of the U.S. Army (1980).
Robin Williams (1951–2014; aged 63), American actor.
Richard Winters (1918–2011; aged 92), American War Hero. WWII veteran and basis for book Band of Brothers and the subsequent HBO miniseries.
W. D. Workman Jr. (1914–1990; aged 76), American journalist and South Carolina Republican politician.
Farnsworth Wright (1888–1940; aged 51), American editor.

See also
 Lewy body dementia, which includes Parkinson's disease dementia

References 

 
Parkinson